Hebe Haven Yacht Club established in 1963, is a private members club located in the picturesque bay of Pak Sha Wan (Hebe Haven) in Sai Kung District, Hong Kong

Objectives 
The Club's main objectives are to unite boat owners and promote boating activities and to provide boating facilities. Since its inception, the members have worked hard to maintain the boating character of their club. Most are water sport enthusiasts and are keen to see the club remain focused on its roots.

Character 
The Club is very sociable; it is well known for its friendly and welcoming attitude towards newcomers. The relaxed atmosphere in the club bar and restaurant is appreciated by the members and the restaurant is renowned for producing some of the best food in the Sai Kung area. Alfresco dining while overlooking the bay of Pak Sha Wan is a favourite for both members and their guests.

Facilities and operations 
The Club has comprehensive marine facilities at competitive prices, when compared to the other main yacht club's in Hong Kong, Royal Hong Kong Yacht Club and Aberdeen Boat Club. The Club currently has 240 swing moorings and hard standings and provides slipping and craning services and boat repair and maintenance facilities. In 2003 an extension to the Club increased the hard standing and provided extra marina berthing.

Racing 
Yacht racing is very popular among Hebe members and races are held almost every weekend. The most popular series for cruisers in Hong Kong, the "Typhoon Series" attracts a significant number of entrants every summer. Everybody is invited to participate and there is always a need for extra crew, irrespective of experience!

Sail training 
The Club owns 50 dinghies and runs dinghy sail training courses for members and non members. The club's fleet includes 10 Optimists, 15 Laser Picos, 9 Laser Standard, 4 Laser Bahia and 4 Laser Stratos. Dinghy racing and supervised dinghy practice sessions are held almost every weekend with enthusiasm for this being led by the junior members of the Club. The Club also now runs an annual 24 Hour Charity Dinghy Race every autumn where other clubs and organizations are encouraged to participate. The sailing centre manager is Rob Allen and he has taken the Sail Training centre to new heights. The club also employs approximately a dozen Assistant Instructors from within the club's junior sailors to assist with operations.

References

External links

Hebe Haven Yacht Club

1963 establishments in Hong Kong
Yacht clubs in China
Sports organisations of Hong Kong
Gentlemen's clubs in Hong Kong